The Swedish Rail Administration was a Swedish State administrative authority which acted as owner on behalf of the State and maintained virtually all main railway lines in Sweden; except for short sidings for freight, heritage railways, the Stockholm Metro, local railways in the Stockholm area (Roslagsbanan & Saltsjöbanan), and the tramways in Gothenburg, Norrköping and Stockholm. Its headquarters was located in Borlänge.

The Swedish Rail Administration was formed in 1988, when Swedish State Railways was split in two parts, leaving Statens Järnvägar as mainly a train operator ( both passenger and freight) and as a real estate owner, only to be split again in 2001.

The Swedish Railway Inspectorate was a part of the Swedish Rail Administration until 2004, when the Swedish Rail Agency was formed, taking over its responsibilities. That agency was in turn incorporated into the newly formed Swedish Transport Agency in 2009.

In 2010, the Government directed a merger with the Swedish Road Administration to create the new Swedish Transport Administration, and the subsidiary responsible for railway maintenance was spun off in a separate aktiebolag, Infranord.

List of directors-general 
Jan Brandborn 1988-1995
Monica Andersson 1995-1997
Bo Bylund 1997-2005
Per-Olof Granbom 2006-2008
Minoo Akhtarzand 2008-2010

References

External links
  (in English)

Defunct railway companies of Sweden
Railway Administration
Railway infrastructure managers
2010 disestablishments in Sweden
Railway companies established in 1988
Railway companies established in 2010
Swedish companies established in 1988
Companies disestablished in 2010
Swedish companies disestablished in 2010